Alexandre Louis François Peyron (21 June 1823, Marines, Val-d'Oise – 9 January 1892, Paris) was a French naval officer and politician. He rose to vice admiral and served as Minister for the Navy and the Colonies from 1883 to 1885.

Sources
bio

French Navy admirals
French Naval Ministers
1823 births
1892 deaths
French life senators